David Egan is a retired American soccer player.  He played professionally in the North American Soccer League and Major Indoor Soccer League.

Egan attended Yale University, playing on the men’s soccer team from 1975 to 1977.   On May 5, 1978, the New England Tea Men of the North American Soccer League signed Egan.  The Tea Men released Egan on December 23, 1978.  Egan then signed with the Pittsburgh Spirit of the Major Indoor Soccer League.

External links
 Career stats

References

Living people
American soccer players
Major Indoor Soccer League (1978–1992) players
New England Tea Men players
North American Soccer League (1968–1984) players
Pittsburgh Spirit players
Yale Bulldogs men's soccer players
Association football defenders
Year of birth missing (living people)